"Devil You Know" is a single by New Zealand band DD Smash. It was released in 1982 and appeared on the album Cool Bananas. It reached No. 35 on the New Zealand charts.

Alternative version
A live version appears on the Dave Dobbyn 2009 greatest hits compilation Beside You—30 Years of Hits.

References

1982 singles
DD Smash songs
Songs written by Dave Dobbyn
1982 songs